The buff-faced scrubwren (Aethomyias perspicillatus) is a bird species in the family Acanthizidae. It is found in the highlands of New Guinea ; Its natural habitat is subtropical or tropical moist montane forests.

This species was formerly placed in the genus Sericornis but following the publication of a molecular phylogenetic study of the scrubwrens in 2018, it was moved to the resurrected genus Aethomyias.

References

buff-faced scrubwren
buff-faced scrubwren
Taxonomy articles created by Polbot
Taxobox binomials not recognized by IUCN